NoonieNoonieNoonie is an anonymous street artist active in Paris. The identity of NNNN is unknown, although they have garnered a lot of French press. In 2017, Ozy Magazine listed NoonieNoonieNoonie as "one of the nine creative stars to know".

See also
 List of street artists

References

Additional sources

External links
@Instagram

Living people
Pseudonymous artists
Guerilla artists
French artists
Year of birth missing (living people)